Galina Marinova (born 1 November 1964) is a retired Bulgarian gymnast who competed at the 1980 Summer Olympics.  

Marinova started gymnastics at age 8 and became a national champion in 7th grade. She was named as an alternate for the 1979 World Championships and ended up competing, including qualifying for the all-around final, after another gymnast was injured. She also competed in the all-around finals at the 1980 Olympics, where she finished 19th, and at the 1981 World Championships. 

After retiring, she opened a gym, All Olympia Gymnastics Center, in Calabasas, California.

References

1964 births
Living people
Gymnasts at the 1980 Summer Olympics
Olympic gymnasts of Bulgaria
Bulgarian female artistic gymnasts